Line 15 of the Xi'an Metro is a rapid transit line running from west to east Xi'an.

Stations (west to east)

References

15